Epopella simplex is a species of symmetrical sessile barnacle in the family Tetraclitidae.

References

Tetraclitidae
Crustaceans described in 1854